Western Australian soccer clubs competed in 2018 for the Football West State Cup, known as the Belt Up Cup for sponsorship reasons. Clubs entered from the National Premier Leagues WA, the two divisions of the State League, a limited number of teams from various divisions of the 2018 Amateur League competition, and from regional teams from the South West, Goldfields and Great Southern regions.

This knockout competition was won by Armadale, their 1st title.

The competition also served as the Western Australian Preliminary Rounds for the 2018 FFA Cup. The two finalists – Armadale SC and Gwelup Croatia – qualified for the final rounds, entering at the Round of 32.

Format

Second round

The round numbers conform to a common format throughout the 2018 FFA Cup preliminary rounds. A total of 32 teams took part in this stage of the competition, from lower divisions of the Amateur League, and from regional teams entering from the South West, Great Southern and Goldfields regions. Matches in this round were played between 11–18 March. For matches where the scores were equal at full-time, they went straight to penalties.

Third round
A total of 38 teams took part in this stage of the competition. New teams that enter at this round were from Football West State League Division 1 (11 teams) and Football West State League Division 2 (11 teams). Matches in this round were played on 23–29 March.

Fourth round
A total of 32 teams took part in this stage of the competition. Clubs from the National Premier Leagues WA entered into the competition at this stage, with the exception of Perth Glory Youth who were not eligible. Matches in this round were played on 2 April.

Fifth round
A total of 16 teams took part in this stage of the competition. Matches in this round were played on 25 April.

Notes:
 † = After Extra Time

Sixth round
A total of 8 clubs took part at this stage of the competition. Matches were played on 19–20 May.

Notes:
 † = After Extra Time

Seventh round
A total of 4 clubs took part at this stage of the competition. Matches were  played on 4 June.

Final
The 2018 State Cup Final, known as the Belt Up State Cup Final for sponsorship reasons, was played on 14 July 2018, at the neutral venue of Dorrien Gardens.

References

Football West State Cup
WA State Challenge